Numarán is a town and seat of the municipality of the same name, in the central Mexican state of Michoacán. As of 2010, the town had a population of 9,794.

References

Municipalities of Michoacán